Azamat Bitiev (born 9 December 1989) is a Russian rugby union player who generally plays as a prop represented Russia internationally.

He was included in the Russian squad for the 2019 Rugby World Cup which is scheduled to be held in Japan for the first time and also marks his first World Cup appearance.

Career 
He made his international debut for Russia against Zimbabwe on 17 November 2015.

Honours
 Russian Championships (3): 2015, 2020-21, 2021-22
 Russian Cup (6): 2015, 2018, 2019, 2020, 2021, 2022

References 

Russian rugby union players
Russia international rugby union players
Living people
1989 births
Rugby union props
Yenisey-STM Krasnoyarsk players